Tlalixcoyan (pronounced Tlah-leeks-KOH-yan) is a municipality in Veracruz, Mexico.

Tlalixcoyan is bordered by: Alvarado, Medellín, and Cotaxtla and is on Mexican Federal Highways 180 and 190.

Lorenzo Barcelata, composer, was born in Tlalixcoyan, Veracruz, and he died in Mexico City from cholera.

In Tlalixcoyan the main indigenous language is the Chinantec.

Populated places in Veracruz